Gia Nadareishvili (Georgian გია ნადარეიშვილი; September 22, 1921 – October 3, 1991) was a Soviet chess composer of Georgian nationality (born in Tbilisi), and author of many books on chess studies.

He was co-founder, with John Roycroft and others, of the Permanent Commission for Chess Composition (PCCC), a body of FIDE presiding over chess composition. He was the USSR delegate in the annual meetings of PCCC until his death. In 1980 he was awarded from FIDE the title of Grandmaster for chess composition.

Nadareishvili composed about 500 studies, winning 21 first prizes, 25 second prizes and 20 third prizes in international tourneys. He published many books on endgame studies, including a collection of 312 studies commented by 43 famous grandmasters.

By profession Nadareishvili was a neurologist, head of the neurology department of the central hospital of Tbilisi. He was awarded the title of Honorary Doctor by the Georgian state.

A study by Gia Nadareishvili

Solution:
1. Rf1+!   g1=N+  (after 2. g1=Q? white takes the black rook, other black moves lead to a quicker mate)
2. Rxg1+   Rxg1  3. Rf2!!  Be5  (otherwise black gets checkmated immediately)
4. Rh2+!  Bxh2  5. Nf2 mate.

Notes

1921 births
1991 deaths
Grandmasters for chess composition
Chess composers
Soviet chess players
Chess players from Georgia (country)
Soviet chess writers
Soviet male writers
20th-century male writers
Sportspeople from Tbilisi
Writers from Georgia (country)
Neurologists from Georgia (country)
20th-century chess players